International rugby league matches were played throughout 2018.

A † denotes a recognised, but unofficial match that did not contribute to the RLIF World Rankings.

Men

January
No men's international test matches were played.

February

March
No men's international test matches were played.

April

May
No men's international test matches were played.

June

Notes:
 Paul Wani became the first Papua New Guinean to referee an international match since Graham Ainui in 1991.

Notes:
 Rhadley Brawa, Junior Rau (both Papua New Guinea), King Vuniyayawa, and Pio Sokobalavu (both Fiji) made their Test debuts.

Notes:
 Robert Jennings, Tevita Tatola (both Tonga), Josh Aloiai, Michael Chee-Kam, Christian Crichton, Tyrone May, Isaiah Papali'i, and Ligi Sao (all Samoa) made their Test debuts, while Jorge Taufua made his debut for Samoa having previously represented Tonga.

Notes:
 Newly appointed New Zealand coach Michael Maguire opted not to name a captain for this Test match. Issac Luke took de facto control of the role.
 Jake Connor, Thomas Makinson (both England), Slade Griffin, and Jamayne Isaako (both New Zealand) made their Test debuts, while  Leeson Ah Mau, Herman Ese'ese, Raymond Faitala-Mariner, Esan Marsters, Ken Maumalo made their debuts for New Zealand having previously represented another nation (Samoa in all cases, except Cook Islands for Marsters).
 This match set the highest attendance for a standalone rugby league match played in the United States, eclipsing the 12,349 that attended the 1987 State of Origin exhibition match at Veterans Memorial Stadium in Long Beach and the ≈12,000-12,500 that attended the 2008 pre-season trial between the South Sydney Rabbitohs and the Leeds Rhinos at Hodges Stadium in Jacksonville. An international between the United States and Canada at Baltimore Memorial Stadium in 1995, which acted as a curtain raiser for a CFL match between the Baltimore Stallions and Toronto Argonauts, posted a crowd of 27,853.

July

Notes:
 Bartek Sierota became the first Pole to referee an international match.

August

September

October

Notes:
 Joseph Manu, Brandon Smith (both New Zealand), Damien Cook, Luke Keary, and Latrell Mitchell (all Australia) made their Test debuts, while James Tedesco made his debut for Australia having previously represented Italy.

Notes:
 Oliver Holmes, Tom Johnstone, Reece Lyne, Adam Milner, Jamie Shaul, Liam Sutcliffe, Luke Thompson (all England), Lambert Belmas, Paul Marcon, and Anthony Marion (all France) made their Test debuts, while Robbie Mulhern made his debut for England having previously represented Ireland.

Notes:
 The Australian players agreed to a one-time reduction of their $20,000 match payments in order to make this match financially viable.November

Notes:
 In their seventh meeting, this was the first time Jamaica has won against the United States. Jamaica became the 11th team to qualify for the 2021 Rugby League World Cup.Notes:
 This was a part of the 2018 South American Cup.

Notes:
 This was a part of the 2018 South American Cup.

Notes:
 This was a part of the 2018 South American Cup.

DecemberNo men's international test matches were played.''

Women

References

2018 in rugby league